Takeshi Fukunaga is a Japanese filmmaker based in New York.

His first feature film, Out of My Hand (2015) premiered in the Panorama section at the 65th Berlin International Film Festival and won the US Fiction Award at the 2015 Los Angeles Film Festival. He won the George C. Lin Emerging Filmmaker Award at the 2015 San Diego Asian Film Festival.

The film was later released worldwide through Ava DuVernay’s distribution company, ARRAY. Takeshi was nominated for the John Cassavetes Award at the 2016 Independent Spirit Awards. In 2017, he was selected for The Residence by Cannes Film Festival's Cinéfondation to develop his second feature film.

Select filmography
 Out of My Hand (2015)
 Ainu Mosir (2020)
 Mountain Woman (2023)

External links
 
 Takeshi Fukunaga(Wikipedia:Japanese)

References 

Japanese film directors
1982 births
Living people
People from Date, Hokkaido